The Atatürk Dam, originally the Karababa Dam, is the third largest dam in the world and it is a zoned rock-fill dam with a central core on the Euphrates River on the border of Adıyaman Province and Şanlıurfa Province in the Southeastern Anatolia Region of Turkey. Built both to generate electricity and to irrigate the plains in the region, it was renamed in honour of Mustafa Kemal Atatürk (1881–1938), the founder of the Turkish Republic. The construction began in 1983 and was completed in 1990. The dam and the hydroelectric power plant, which went into service after the upfilling of the reservoir was completed in 1992, are operated by the State Hydraulic Works (DSİ). The reservoir created behind the dam, called Atatürk Reservoir, is the third largest in Turkey.

Centerpiece of the 22 dams on the Euphrates and the Tigris, which comprise the integrated, multi-sector, Southeastern Anatolia Project (known as GAP), it is one of the world's largest dams. The Atatürk Dam, one of the five operational dams on the Euphrates as of 2008, was preceded by Keban and Karakaya dams upstream and followed by Birecik and the Karkamış dams downstream. Two more dams on the river have been under construction.

The hydroelectric power plant (HEPP) has a total installed power capacity of 2,400 MW and generates 8,900 GW·h electricity annually.

The dam was depicted on the reverse of the Turkish one-million-lira banknotes of 1995–2005 and of the 1 new lira banknote of 2005–2009.

Dam
The initial development project for the southeastern region of Turkey was presented in 1970. As the objectives for regional development have changed significantly and the ambitions have grown in the 1970s, the original plan underwent major modifications. The most important change in the project was abandoning the Middle Karababa Dam design, and adopting the design of the Atatürk Dam to increase the storage and power generation capacities of the dam.

Dolsar Engineering and ATA Construction, two prominent Turkish companies, signed for the building of the dam. The construction of the cofferdam began in 1985 and was completed in 1987. The fill work for the main dam lasted from 1987 to 1990. The Atatürk Dam, listed in international construction publications as the world's largest construction site, was completed in a world record time of around 50 months.

The rock-fill dam undergoes deformations that are regularly and systematically monitored since 1990 with different types of sensors. It is estimated that the central portion of the dam crest has settled by around  since the end of the construction. Settlement of the dam crest up to  has been measured since the start of the detailed geodetic monitoring in 1992.

The permeation grouting work was carried out by subcontractor Solétanche Bachy and the rehabilitation work for the post-tensioning of the dam crest with ground anchors by Vorspann System Losinger International (VSL).

Hydroelectric power plant
The HEPP of the Atatürk Dam is the biggest of a series of 19 power plants of the GAP project. It consists of eight Francis turbine and generator groups of 300 MW each, supplied by Sulzer Escher Wyss and ABB Asea Brown Boveri respectively. The up to  steel pressure pipes (penstocks) with a total weight of 26.600 tons were supplied and installed by the German NOELL company (today DSD NOELL). The power plant's first two power units came on line in 1992 and it became fully operational in December 1993. The HEPP can generate 8,900 GWh of electricity annually. Its capacity makes up around one third of the total capacity of the GAP project.

During the periods of low demand for electricity, only one of the eight units of the HEPP is in operation while in times of high demand, all the eight units are in operation. Hence, depending upon the energy demand and the state of the interconnected system, the amount of water to be released from the HEPP might vary between 200 and 2,000 m3/s in one day.

Irrigation

Originating in the mountains of eastern Anatolia and flowing southwards to Syria and Iraq, the Euphrates and the Tigris are very irregular rivers, used to cause great problems each year with droughts in summer and flooding in winter. The water of the Euphrates River is regulated by means of large reservoirs of the Keban and Atatürk Dams. However, the waters released from the HEPPs of those dams also need to be regulated. The Birecik and the Karkamış Dams downstream the Atatürk Dam are constructed for the purpose of harnessing the waters released from large-scale dams and HEPPs.

The tunnels are the largest in the world, in terms of length and flow rate, built for irrigation purposes. The first tunnel was completed in 1995 and the other in 1996. The reservoir behind the dam will irrigate another 406,000 ha by pumping for a total of 882,000 ha.

The Atatürk Dam and the Şanlıurfa Tunnel system are two major components of the GAP project. Irrigation started in the Harran Plain in the spring of 1995. The impact of the irrigation on the economy of the region is significant. In ninety percent of the irrigated area, cotton is planted. Irrigation expansion within the Harran plains also increased Southeastern Anatolia's cotton production from 164,000 to 400,000 metric tons in 2001, or nearly sixty percent. With almost 50% share of the country's cotton production, the region developed to the leader in Turkey.

Reservoir lake

The reservoir water level touched  amsl in 1994. Since then, it varies between 526 and 537 m amsl.

Some 10 towns and 156 villages of three provinces are located around the Lake Atatürk Dam. The lake provides a fisheries and recreation site. For transportation purposes, several ferries have been operated in the reservoir. The reservoir lake is called "sea" by local people.

Geostrategic importance
About 90% of Euphrates' total annual flow originates in Turkey, while the remaining part is added in Syria, but nothing is contributed further downstream in Iraq. In general, the stream varies greatly in its flow from season to season and year to year.

One of the most important legal texts on the waters of the Euphrates-Tigris river system is the protocol annexed to the 1946 Treaty of Friendship and Good Neighborly Relations between Iraq and Turkey. The protocol provided the control and management of the Euphrates and the Tigris depending to a large extent on the regulations of flow in Turkish source areas. Turkey agreed to begin monitoring the two border-crossing rivers and to share related data with Iraq. In 1980, Turkey and Iraq further specified the nature of the earlier protocol by forming a joint committee on technical issues, which Syria joined later in 1982 as well. Turkey unilaterally guaranteed to allow 15.75 km3/year (500 m3/s) of water across the border to Syria without any formal agreement on the sharing of the Euphrates water.

Mid-January 1990, when the first phase of the dam was completed, Turkey held back the flow of the Euphrates entirely for a month to begin filling up the reservoir. Turkey had notified Syria and Iraq by November 1989 of her decision to fill the reservoir over a period of one month explaining the technical reasons and providing a detailed program for making up for the losses. The downstream neighbors protested vehemently. At this point, the Atatürk Dam has cut the flow from the Euphrates by about a third.

Syria and Iraq claim to be suffering severe water shortages due to the GAP development. Both countries allege that Turkey is intentionally withholding supplies from its downstream neighbors, turning water into a weapon. It argues that Iraq and Syria in fact benefit from the regulated water by the dams as they protect all three riparian countries from seasonal droughts and floods.

See also

Nissibi Euphrates Bridge

References

External links

 GAP official website

Dams in Şanlıurfa Province
Dams in Adıyaman Province
Hydroelectric power stations in Turkey
Irrigation in Turkey
Southeastern Anatolia Project
Dams on the Euphrates River
Water and politics
Syria–Turkey relations
Dams completed in 1992
Rock-filled dams
Crossings of the Euphrates
Dam